Centre for Development of Advanced Computing (C-DAC) is an institution established in March 1988 as a Scientific Society of the Department of Information Technology (formerly Dept. of Electronics) Ministry of Communications and Information Technology, Government of India. C-DAC is India's National Initiative in advanced computing. C-DAC runs its Multi-Lingual Computing popularly known as the GIST Technology. C-DAC is governed by a Member Governing Council by the Hon’ble Minister for Communication and Information Technology.

C-DAC's GIST-PACE Imparting quality computer education at a reasonable cost. With the intention to take GIST Technology to the grass root levels, the PACE program was developed to impart training in basic & high-end computing using the Indian languages as the medium. This initiative was started in January 1996. This training program has been named Program for Advancing Computer Education – PACE (CDAC PACE).

PACE ATC (Authorized Training Centers) Under the PACE banner, training centers are called C-DAC GIST PACE Authorized Training Centers.

The Centre for Development of Advanced Computing, Ahmedabad PACE Affiliated Training Centre (ATC) of C-DAC, (C-DAC) is the premier organization of the Department of Electronics and Information Technology (DeitY), Ministry of Communications & Information Technology (MCIT) to carry out Research and Development in IT, Electronics, and Associated Skills Education and Development.

Since 1997, C-DAC ACTS Ahmedabad, with its own campus in Ahmedabad, has provided Art and Design education with a focus on providing creative as well as technical education.

Certified Course 

 Adobe Photoshop Course
 Adobe Illustrator Course
 Adobe Premier Course
 Indesign Course
 Coral Course
 Flash Course
 Page Maker Course
 Multi-Lingual Multimedia Course
 Computer Concept (CCC) Course
 Computer Basics & Multilingual Technology Course
 Office Automation (Multilingual) Course
 Advance Excel Course
 Bharateeya Open Office Course
 C Programming Course
 C++ Programming Course
 Visual Basic.Net Course
 Asp.Net Course
 Oracle 9i Course
 Advanced PHP Course
 Advanced Java Course
 Open Source Technologies Course
 Tally 9.0 Course
 Tally ERP 9 with GST Course
 Android App Development Course
 Python Development Course
 Image Editing Course
 Audio & Video Editing Course
 Digital Finance Course

Diploma Course 

 Digital Marketing Course
 Graphics & Multilingual Desktop Publishing Course
 Multilingual Web Technologies & Publishing Course
 Multilingual Multimedia Course
 Office Automation & Fin. Accounting Course
 Hardware & Networking Course
 E-Commerce Course
 Computer Multilingual Programming Course
 Office Automation & Application Of Gist Course
 Java Programming Course
 Computer Multilingual Applications Course

Advanced Diploma Course

 Multilingual Multimedia Course
 Multilingual Computer Applications Course
 Multilingual Computer Programming Course
 Multilingual Computer Teacher Course

References

External links
CDAC , Ahmedabad Website

Ministry of Communications and Information Technology (India)
Research institutes in Ahmedabad
Research institutes in Gujarat
1988 establishments in Gujarat
Research institutes established in 1999